Myke Henry (born December 23, 1992) is an American professional basketball player for Astoria Bydgoszcz of the Polish Basketball League (PLK). He played college basketball for Illinois and DePaul University.

College career
Henry began his college career at University of Illinois where he was recruited by Bruce Weber. After his freshman year Weber was fired, and new head coach John Groce used Henry sparingly as a sophomore which contributed to his decision to transfer to DePaul.

At DePaul, Henry scored a career high 29 points against Stanford on November 30, 2014.

Professional career

2016–17 season
After going undrafted in the 2016 NBA draft, Henry signed with Oklahoma City Blue of the NBA G League for the 2016–17 season. On May 3, 2017, After appearing in 39 games with the Oklahoma City Blue, Henry signed with Rayos de Hermosillo of the CIBACOPA league in Northwestern Mexico.

2017–18 season
On October 23, 2017, Henry returned to the Oklahoma City Blue for the 2017–18 NBA G League season. On January 13, 2018, Henry signed a two-way contract with the Memphis Grizzlies. On July 20, 2018, the Grizzlies waived Henry.

2018–19 season
On July 23, 2018, Henry signed a one-year deal with Ironi Nahariya of the Israeli Premier League. On October 7, 2018, Henry recorded 31 points in his first game with Nahariya, he shot 11-of-17 from the field, along with three rebounds in a 98–95 win over Hapoel Holon. He was subsequently named Israeli League Round 1 MVP. On March 23, 2019, Henry recorded a double-double of 18 points and 11 rebounds, along with three blocks and three assists in a 88–77 win over Hapoel Holon. He was subsequently named Israeli League Round 23 MVP. In 33 games played for Nahariya, he averaged 14.3 points, 5.8 rebounds, 2.1 assists and 1.5 steals per game.

2019–20 season
On September 30, 2019, Henry signed with the Oklahoma City Thunder. He later joined their G League affiliate, the Oklahoma City Blue. On December 28, 2019, Henry accumulated 24 points, nine rebounds, two steals, two blocks and one assist in a 112–89 victory over the Sioux Falls Skyforce. He missed a game with a foot injury in January 2020. Henry averaged 13.4 points, 5.4 rebounds and 1.8 assists per game.

2020–21 season
On July 11, 2020, Henry signed with Pallacanestro Trieste of the Italian Lega Basket Serie A (LBA).

2021–22 season
On July 16, 2021, Henry signed with Champagne Châlons-Reims of the French LNB Pro A. He averaged 12.6 points per game, but was waived on January 8, 2022.

On January 28, 2022, Henry signed with Iraklis Thessaloniki of the Greek Basket League. In 12 games, he averaged 15.4 points, 6.4 rebounds, 2.2 assists and 1.4 steals in 27 minutes per contest.

2022–23 season
On July 2, 2022, he signed with Scafati Basket of the Lega Basket Serie A.

On December 1, 2022, he signed with Astoria Bydgoszcz of the Polish Basketball League (PLK).

International career
Henry joined a Chicago based 3x3 basketball team composed of Stefhon Hannah, Kavon Lytch, and Alfonzo McKinnie who went undefeated in the 2016 USA Basketball 3x3 National Championship that was played Aug. 27–28 at the United States Olympic Training Center in Colorado Springs, Colorado. The team represented the United States at the 2016 FIBA 3x3 World Championship in Guangzhou, China and won the silver medal.

Personal life
When Henry was 17 years old, his 15-year old brother DJ was shot and killed as an innocent bystander to gang violence.

Career statistics

NBA

Regular season

|-
| align="left" | 
| align="left" | Memphis
| 20 || 0 || 18.9 || .376 || .328 || .600 || 1.9 || 1.1 || 1.5 || .3 || 5.3
|- class="sortbottom"
| style="text-align:center;" colspan=2| Career
| 20 || 0 || 18.9 || .376 || .328 || .600 || 1.9 || 1.1 || 1.5 || .3 || 5.3

References

External links

G League profile
RealGM profile
Depaul Blue Demons bio
Illinois Fighting Illini bio

1992 births
Living people
21st-century African-American sportspeople
African-American basketball players
American expatriate basketball people in Greece
American expatriate basketball people in Israel
American expatriate basketball people in Mexico
American men's 3x3 basketball players
American men's basketball players
Astoria Bydgoszcz players
Basketball players from Chicago
DePaul Blue Demons men's basketball players
Illinois Fighting Illini men's basketball players
Iraklis Thessaloniki B.C. players
Ironi Nahariya players
Memphis Grizzlies players
Memphis Hustle players
Oklahoma City Blue players
Rayos de Hermosillo players
Scafati Basket players
Shooting guards
Small forwards
Undrafted National Basketball Association players